The canton of Langeais is an administrative division of the Indre-et-Loire department, central France. Its borders were modified at the French canton reorganisation which came into effect in March 2015. Its seat is in Langeais.

It consists of the following communes:
 
Ambillou
Avrillé-les-Ponceaux
Benais
Bourgueil
Braye-sur-Maulne
Brèches
Channay-sur-Lathan
La Chapelle-sur-Loire
Château-la-Vallière
Chouzé-sur-Loire
Cinq-Mars-la-Pile
Cléré-les-Pins
Continvoir
Coteaux-sur-Loire
Couesmes
Courcelles-de-Touraine
Gizeux
Hommes
Langeais
Lublé
Marcilly-sur-Maulne
Mazières-de-Touraine
Restigné
Rillé
Saint-Laurent-de-Lin
Saint-Nicolas-de-Bourgueil
Savigné-sur-Lathan
Souvigné
Villiers-au-Bouin

References

Cantons of Indre-et-Loire